The 2001 Auburn Tigers football team represented Auburn University in the 2001 NCAA Division I-A football season.
They posted a 7–5 record, including a record of 5–3 in the Southeastern Conference.  The Tigers finished the season tied for first place in the SEC West Division, but did not qualify for the SEC Championship Game because of tie-breakers.

Auburn's season was highlighted by a 23–20 victory over #1-ranked Florida on October 13.  On November 10, the Tigers beat rival Georgia, 24–17, led by running back Carnell Williams, who carried the ball 41 times and made several receptions, one on a long screen pass to set up his game-winning touchdown run.  Auburn was  scheduled to play LSU on September 15, but as a result of the September 11, 2001 attacks, the game was postponed until December 1.  This was the first time that Auburn did not end its regular season schedule against arch rival Alabama in the Iron Bowl since the series was resumed in 1948 after a 41-year hiatus.

While Auburn was unranked at the end of the season in both major polls, several BCS computer rating systems such as Massey (#23), Sagarin (#24) and The Seattle Times (#24) included the Tigers in their final top 25 rankings.

Schedule

Roster

Game summaries

Florida

    
    
    
    
    
    
    
    
    

Almost seven years earlier, Auburn had defeated #1 Florida and snapped their home win streak.

Georgia

Source: Sports Illustrated
    
    
    
    
    
    
    

AUB: Cadillac Williams 41 Rush, 167 Yds

References

Auburn
Auburn Tigers football seasons
Auburn Tigers football